Impatiens sodenii is a species of flowering plant in the family Balsaminaceae known by the common names poor man's rhododendron, Oliver's touch-me-not, and shrub balsam. It is native to Kenya and Tanzania, and widely cultivated as an ornamental plant.

Description
This plant is a subshrub growing up to 1.5 meters tall. The stems are succulent, and woody toward the bases. It is hairless, with leaves in whorls of up to 12, especially near the ends of the branches. The leaves are widely lance-shaped, or occasionally more oblong, with toothed edges. They are up to 18 centimeters long. 

Flowers occur year-round, singly or in pairs. They are white or pink, sometimes with darker markings, and measure up to 5 centimeters in width. The lowest sepal behind the corolla tapers into a long, thin spur up to 8 centimeters long. The greenish fruit capsule is up to 2.4 centimeters long and undergoes explosive dehiscence when mature.

Cultivation
This plant is used as an ornamental garden shrub, and is a recipient of the Royal Horticultural Society's Award of Garden Merit.

Several cultivars have been bred, including the white-flowered 'Madonna'. 'Flash' has white flowers with pink markings, and 'La Vida Rosa' has flowers marked with a deeper pink.

Weed
This is the most commonly grown impatiens in New Zealand, where it has escaped cultivation and become a weed. It is cultivated in Australia, where it has naturalized in a few areas in Western Australia and New South Wales. It is documented as an introduced species in the Canary Islands, Hawaii, and Colombia.

References

sodenii
Flora of Kenya
Flora of Tanzania